Arrúa is a surname of Basque origins. Notable people with the surname include:

Saturnino Arrúa (born 1949) Paraguayan retired footballer
Matías Arrúa (born 1983) Argentine footballer
José Arrúa (born 1988) Paraguayan footballer

Basque-language surnames